TCA College (Malaysia) (TCAM) is an interdenominational Charismatic Bible College located in the town of Petaling Jaya, Selangor, Malaysia. Established in 1998 as a regional school of the Theological Centre for Asia in Singapore, TCAM is accredited by the Asia Theological Association (ATA) and the Asia Pacific Theological Association (APTA).

External links 
 TCAM Website
 TCA Singapore Website
 TCAM Kajang Extension Website

Petaling Jaya
Seminaries and theological colleges in Malaysia
Protestantism in Malaysia
Educational institutions established in 1998
1998 establishments in Malaysia